A detachment (from the French détachement) is a military unit. It can either be detached from a larger unit for a specific function or (particularly in United States military usage) be a permanent unit smaller than a battalion. The term is often used to refer to a unit that is assigned to a different base from the parent unit. An example is the United States Army's 1st Special Forces Operational Detachment-Delta (Airborne) (SFOD-D), commonly known as Delta Force by the general public.

Detachment is also the term used as the collective noun for personnel manning an artillery piece (e.g. gun detachment).

Use by Cadet forces in the United Kingdom
The Army Cadet Force in the United Kingdom breaks its structure down into local detachments which usually consist of between 10 and 40 cadets. Several detachments make up a company.

The Combined Cadet Force, however, does not use this term. Individual units are known as Cadet Contingents.

See also
 Geographically Separate Unit

References

Military terminology